Martin Bengtsson is a Swedish metal musician. He was a key part of the influential Swedish melodic death metal scene. He was a member of the melodic death metal band Arch Enemy between 1997 and 1998, and played bass guitar on their second album, Stigmata. He was also a member of Arch Enemy guitarist Christopher Amott's side project Armageddon in 1997.
Bengtsson is currently the vocalist and lead guitarist in the heavy metal band Lechery.

References

Death metal musicians
Swedish heavy metal bass guitarists
Swedish heavy metal guitarists
Swedish heavy metal singers
Swedish male singers
Arch Enemy members
Living people
Male bass guitarists
1974 births